Sunnyvale is a Caltrain station in Sunnyvale, California. The station is within walking distance of the historic downtown of Sunnyvale and the new Cityline Sunnyvale shopping center.

History
The station plaza and parking structure were built in 2003, replacing the earlier station building.

In March 2018, work began on the Sunnyvale Station Rehabilitation Project, which shifted the north pedestrian crossing further north by approximately 80 feet to accommodate six-car trains at station platforms. Work was completed in April 2019.

References

External links

Caltrain - Sunnyvale station

Caltrain stations in Santa Clara County, California
Railway stations in the United States opened in 2003
Transportation in Sunnyvale, California
Former Southern Pacific Railroad stations in California